The French Lick Charity Championship is a tournament on the Epson Tour, the LPGA's developmental tour. It has been a part of the Symetra Tour's schedule since 2017. It is held at French Lick Resort in French Lick, Indiana.

The tournament is held on the Donald Ross Course, named in honor of the Scottish-born golf course designer Donald Ross, who built the resort's second course in 1917.

The 2020 tournament was cancelled due to the COVID-19 pandemic.

With her win in 2021, Casey Danielson took the Symetra Tour money lead and wrapped up an LPGA Tour card for 2022.

Starting in 2022, the event is hosted on the resort's second course, the Pete Dye Course, and contested over 72 holes with a purse of $335,000.

Winners

References

External links

Coverage on Epson Tour website

Symetra Tour events
Golf in Indiana
Recurring sporting events established in 2017
2017 establishments in Indiana